17th National Board of Review Awards
December 21, 1945
The 17th National Board of Review Awards were announced on 21 December 1945.

Best English Language Films
The True Glory
The Lost Weekend
The Southerner
The Story of G.I. Joe
The Last Chance
The Life and Death of Colonel Blimp
A Tree Grows In Brooklyn
The Fighting Lady
The Way Ahead
The Clock

Winners
Best English Language Film: The True Glory
Best Actor: Ray Milland (The Lost Weekend)
Best Actress: Joan Crawford (Mildred Pierce)
Best Director: Jean Renoir (The Southerner)

External links
National Board of Review of Motion Pictures :: Awards for 1945

1945
1945 film awards
1945 in American cinema